Richard Keith Robert Coles  (born 26 March 1962) is an English writer, radio presenter and Church of England clergyman who was the vicar of Finedon in Northamptonshire from 2011 to 2022. He first came to prominence as the multi-instrumentalist who partnered Jimmy Somerville in the 1980s band the Communards. They achieved three top ten hits, including the No. 1 record and best-selling single of 1986, a dance version of "Don't Leave Me This Way".

Coles frequently appears on radio and television as well as in newspapers and, in March 2011, became the host of BBC Radio 4's Saturday Live programme. He is a regular contributor to QI, Would I Lie to You? and Have I Got News for You. He is an author, Chancellor of the University of Northampton, Honorary Chaplain to the Worshipful Company of Leathersellers, and a patron of social housing project Greatwell Homes in Wellingborough.

Personal life
Coles was born in Northampton, England. His grandfather was a prosperous shoe manufacturer. The company failed under Coles's father because of the increasing popularity of cheaper foreign imports and the family lost much of their wealth.

He was educated at the independent Wellingborough School (where he was a choirboy) and at the South Warwickshire College of Further Education (Department of Drama & the Liberal Arts) in Stratford-upon-Avon. He later attended King's College London where he studied theology from 1990. Coles was awarded an MA by research from the University of Leeds in 2005 for work on the Greek text of the Epistle to the Ephesians.

Coles is gay. The first person who Coles came out to was his mother, in 1978, when he was 16. He played her Tom Robinson's "Glad to Be Gay" four times before she said "Darling, are you trying to tell me something?" Coles has spoken about the "mental crisis" that he suffered following his coming out, which ultimately led to him attempting suicide and being diagnosed with clinical depression.

Coles lived with his partner, David Coles (né Oldham), in an asserted celibate relationship until the latter's death in December 2019. Following the death, Coles said he had received hate mail claiming that his partner is in hell. The Church of England has allowed priests to enter a civil partnership since 2005 and Richard and David entered into one in 2010. Coles later said that the relationship was not celibate, but he had to promise celibacy in order to maintain his job as a vicar.

His older brother, Andy, a former Metropolitan Police officer, was elected in 2015 as a Conservative councillor in Peterborough and was appointed deputy Cambridgeshire Police and Crime Commissioner in 2016. After a mention in Coles' 2014 autobiography, he was accused of having deceived a 19-year-old political activist into a sexual relationship while he was a 32-year-old undercover police officer in the 1990s and resigned as deputy commissioner on 15 May 2017. This relationship was part of a wider scandal involving undercover police officers in the UK getting into relationships with political activists in this period.

Coles is a member of the Labour Party. He is also a member of the Gaelic Athletic Association (GAA), having become enthusiastic about GAA sports through watching the 2020 TV series Normal People. Family ties led to Coles selecting Cork, Ireland as his county and St Finbarr's as his club. The club responded by sending him a membership card.

Coles moved to Friston, East Sussex in May 2022 to be closer to his friend and former manager Lorna Gradden. He said "I'll be living in a charming 18th-century cottage with a bow window that looms over the street affording a privileged view of my neighbours' comings and goings, as the scent of lavender floats across the village green."

Musical career
Coles learned to play the saxophone, clarinet and keyboards and moved to London in 1980, where he played in theatre. In 1983, he appeared with Jimmy Somerville in the Lesbian and Gay Youth Video Project film Framed Youth: The Revenge of the Teenage Perverts, which won the Grierson Award. Coles joined Bronski Beat (initially on saxophone) in 1983.

Somerville left Bronski Beat and in 1985 he and Coles formed the Communards, who were together for just over three years and had three UK top 10 hits, including the biggest-selling single of 1986, a version of "Don't Leave Me This Way", which was at number one for four weeks. The band split in 1988 and Somerville went solo.

Post-music career and church ministry

Coles provided narration for the Style Council's film JerUSAlem in 1987 and also started a career as a writer, particularly with the Times Literary Supplement and the Catholic Herald. He took up religion in his late twenties, after "the best of times, the worst of times", pop success and the deaths of friends as a result of HIV. From 1991 to 1994 he studied for a BA in theology at King's College London. While at university, Coles became a Roman Catholic and remained so for the next ten years before returning to Anglicanism in 2001.

Coles was selected for training for the priesthood in the Church of England and began his training at the College of the Resurrection, Mirfield, West Yorkshire, in 2003, before being ordained in 2005. After ordination, he was a curate at St Botolph's Church in Boston, Lincolnshire and then at St Paul's Church, Knightsbridge in London. He has been chaplain of the Royal Academy of Music and has also played Dr Frank N Furter in a local concert and has conducted an atheist funeral for Mo Mowlam in 2005.

Coles was an inspiration for the character of Adam Smallbone (played by Tom Hollander) in BBC Two sitcom Rev. and was also  an advisor to the show. Coles mentions in his book Fathomless Riches that he is also the inspiration for the character "Tom" in the Bridget Jones novels. In January 2011, Coles was appointed as the vicar of St Mary the Virgin, Finedon in the Diocese of Peterborough.

Since 2011, Coles has been on the board of Wellingborough Homes, a social enterprise providing housing and community support for the Borough of Wellingborough and, after its name change to Greatwell Homes, became its Patron. In 2012, Coles was awarded an honorary doctorate by the University of Northampton and also became a fellow of the Royal Society of Arts. In 2016, he was awarded an honorary DLitt by the University of Warwick. In 2019 he was appointed Honorary Chaplain to the Worshipful Company of Leathersellers. 

In July 2017, Coles was elected a Fellow of King's College London and separately as Chancellor of the University of Northampton. 

Coles retired as vicar of Finedon on Low Sunday 2022. Looking back on his time as a "half-time vicar", he said: "“How do you do all the things you do?” I am frequently asked, and the answer is by neglecting important things and disappointing people. I was once called in the middle of the night to attend a parishioner’s deathbed and I could not because I was in Glasgow doing Celebrity Antiques Road Trip. I found someone to cover, but it should have been me." He explained: "I will still be a priest, I will always be a priest, and I will minister where I am able. Next month I am going to my first conference of prison chaplains and I hope I can make myself useful as a volunteer with inmates in the criminal justice system."

In April 2022, Coles announced that he retired from parish duties due to the Church of England allegedly increasingly excluding gay couples, and what he described as its "conservative, punchy and fundamentalist" direction.

Writing
On 1 November 2012 (All Saints' Day), Darton, Longman and Todd published Coles' book, Lives of the Improbable Saints, illustrated by Ted Harrison, a précis of the life stories of nearly 200 lesser-known saints. The following year, Volume two, Legends of the Improbable Saints, followed. 

In 2014, the first volume of his memoirs, Fathomless Riches, was published by Weidenfeld & Nicolson. In 2016 a follow-up volume, Bringing in the Sheaves, was published. 

In June 2022, Coles' debut mystery novel Murder Before Evensong was released. It is intended to be first in a series about Canon Daniel Clement.

Broadcasting and media appearances
Coles still works as a broadcaster, which he describes as "just showing off", including Nightwaves on Radio 3, which he formerly presented, and Newsnight Review on BBC Two. He has appeared on the Radio 4 panel game show Heresy twice; first in May 2008 and then in May 2010. 
Coles has appeared seven times as a guest on the topical television news quiz Have I Got News for You, in 1994, May 2009, May 2013, April 2016, June 2017, April 2020 and May 2021. He presented a special edition of Songs of Praise in January 2010. He was a guest on the Children in Need special of the BBC quiz Only Connect in November of the same year. In 2011 he presented a four-part Radio 3 series called Out in the World: A Global Gay History.

He regularly guest-hosted the Radio 4 programme Saturday Live, while the regular host Fi Glover was on maternity leave from 2008 to 2009. Coles replaced Glover permanently in 2011. On 1 September 2011, he presented a short piece on his home town and parish of Finedon for the Radio 4 programme You and Yours. In December 2012, December 2013 and November 2014, Coles appeared as a guest on the BBC comedy quiz show QI. In January 2014, he won the BBC's Celebrity Mastermind, with his specialist subject being the Mapp and Lucia novels of E. F. Benson.

Coles featured as the subject of Fern Britton Meets... on BBC1 in December 2014. Since 2014 he has appeared regularly in the "Pause for Thought" slot on Radio 2's The Chris Evans Breakfast Show, for which he won a Jerusalem Award in 2014.

In July 2016, Coles appeared on the BBC cooking series Celebrity Masterchef, finishing in fifth place. In December 2021, he once again appeared on the programme, this time winning the edition. In February 2017, he co-presented The Big Painting Challenge with Mariella Frostrup on BBC1. From September 2017, Coles was a contestant in the 15th series of BBC's Strictly Come Dancing. He was paired with professional dancer Dianne Buswell. They were the second couple to be eliminated after scoring 14 points for their Pasodoble to Flash Gordon – at the time, the lowest scoring Pasodoble in the history of the show.

On 18 December 2017 Coles was a guest panellist on the Christmas special of the eleventh series of BBC1 comedy quiz Would I Lie to You?, hosted by Rob Brydon. Coles was captain of a team from the University of Leeds who were series champions on the BBC's Christmas 2019 University Challenge. In December 2020 Coles was featured in the BBC series Winter Walks, walking from Sutton Bank to Rievaulx Abbey. He said, "At the centre of what we do in order to be who we are, we need silence, we need retreat, we need contemplation."

Coles appeared in a January 2021 episode of the BBC Four series Britain's Lost Masterpieces, discussing the story of the Magi in the gospels, in relation to a portrayal of Balthazar by Joos van Cleve.

In August 2022, Coles appeared in the Channel 4 documentary Good Grief with Reverend Richard Coles, discovering some of the different ways people deal with bereavement.

From 7 to 11 November 2022 Coles guest hosted Channel 4's game show 'Countdown' as part of its 40th anniversary celebrations.

Works

Discography

 The Communards' studio albums:
 Communards (1986)
 Red (1987)

Bibliography

Non-fiction
Lives of the Improbable Saints (illustrated by Ted Harrison, Darton, Longman & Todd, 2012)
Legends of the Improbable Saints (illustrated by Ted Harrison, Darton, Longman & Todd, 2013)
Fathomless Riches: Or How I Went From Pop to Pulpit (W&N, 2014)
Bringing in the Sheaves: Wheat and Chaff from My Years as a Priest (W&N, 2016)
The Madness of Grief: A Memoir of Love and Loss (W&N, 2021)

Fiction
Canon Clement Mysteries
Murder Before Evensong (W&N, 2022)

A Death in the Parish: (Forthcoming: (Unknown, June 2023)

Honours

Scholastic

Chancellor, visitor, governor and fellowships

Honorary degrees

Memberships and fellowships

References

External links
 Official website
 Reverend Richard Coles interviewed on Meet The Writers, Monocle 24 with Georgina Godwin
 
 Saturday Live (BBC Radio 4)
 Richard Coles on The Guardian

1962 births
20th-century English LGBT people
20th-century English male musicians
21st-century British male writers
21st-century British non-fiction writers
21st-century English Anglican priests
21st-century English LGBT people
21st-century English memoirists
Alumni of King's College London
Alumni of the College of the Resurrection
Alumni of the University of Leeds
BBC Radio 3 presenters
BBC Radio 4 presenters
British gay writers
Converts to Anglicanism from Roman Catholicism
Converts to Roman Catholicism from atheism or agnosticism
English autobiographers
English keyboardists
English male journalists
English pop musicians
Fellows of King's College London
English gay musicians
LGBT Anglican clergy
Labour Party (UK) people
Living people
Musicians from Northamptonshire
People educated at Wellingborough School
People from Finedon
People from Northampton
The Communards members
Church of England priests